Lawson Lysnar Copland Field  (11 February 1896 – 29 May 1981) was a New Zealand farmer and aerial-topdressing operator. He was born in Gisborne, New Zealand on 11 February 1896.

In the 1967 Queen's Birthday Honours, Field was appointed an Officer of the Order of the British Empire, for services to farming.

References

1896 births
1981 deaths
New Zealand farmers
People from Gisborne, New Zealand
New Zealand aviators
New Zealand Officers of the Order of the British Empire